Jessica Davis (born October 31, 1992) is an American bobsledder.

She participated at the IBSF World Championships 2019, winning a medal.

References

External links

1992 births
Living people
American female bobsledders
21st-century American women